The women's moguls event in freestyle skiing at the 2014 Winter Olympics in Sochi, Russia took place on the 6 February (first qualification) and 8 February (second qualification, semifinals, and final) at the Rosa Khutor Extreme Park in Krasnaya Polyana, Sochi.

The defending Olympic and world champion was Hannah Kearney of the United States. Kearney returned to the podium, winning the 2014 bronze medal.  The first two places were won by sisters, for only the fourth time in Olympic history: Canadian Justine Dufour-Lapointe earned gold while her sister Chloé won the silver. The third Dufour-Lapointe sister on the Canadian team, Maxime, made it to Final 2 in the event. Maxime, Justine, and Chloé Dufour-Lapointe became the first three sisters in Olympics history to compete in the same event. This was Justine Dufour-Lapointe's first Olympics, whereas Chloé was ranked fifth in Vancouver 2010.

Qualification

An athlete must have placed in the top 30 in at a World Cup event after July 2012 or at the 2013 World Championships and a minimum of 80 FIS points. A total of 30 quota spots were available to athletes to compete at the games. A maximum of 4 athletes could be entered by a National Olympic Committee.

Results

Qualification
In the first qualifying round, the ten best athletes directly qualified for the final. Others competed in the second qualification round.

Qualifying 1
 QF — Qualified directly for the final
 QS — Qualified for the semifinal
 Bib — Bib number
 DNF — Did not finish
 DNS — Did not start

Qualifying 2
 Q — Qualified for the final
 Bib — Bib number
 DNF — Did not finish
 DNS — Did not start

Final
The finals were started at 22:00.

Final 1
 Q — Qualified for next round
 Bib — Bib number
 DNF — Did not finish
 DNS — Did not start

Yekaterina Stolyarova fell after the second jump, was still able to complete the distance but was ranked last.

Final 2
 Q — Qualified for next round
 Bib — Bib number
 DNF — Did not finish
 DNS — Did not start

Final 3

References

Women's freestyle skiing at the 2014 Winter Olympics